Get Off the Cross, We Need the Wood for the Fire is the debut studio album by Firewater, released on October 22, 1996 by Jetset Records. It is a marked difference in sound from Tod Ashley's previous work in Cop Shoot Cop. In 2017, the album was re-issued on vinyl in celebration of the twentieth anniversary of its release by Checkered Past Records.

Track listing

Personnel
Adapted from the Get Off the Cross, We Need the Wood for the Fire liner notes.

Firewater
Tod Ashley – lead vocals, bass guitar, acoustic guitar, bouzouki, production
Duane Denison – guitar
Yuval Gabay – drums, djembe, tambourine
Kurt Hoffman – saxophone, clarinet, accordion
Jim Kimball – drums
David Ouimet – piano, organ
Hahn Rowe – violin

Additional musicians
Jennifer Charles – vocals (5, 9)
Jane Scarpantoni – cello (3, 5, 7)

Production
Doug Henderson – production, recording, mixing
Rod Hui – mixing (9)
Scott Hull – mastering

Release history

References

External links 
 

1996 debut albums
Firewater (band) albums
Albums produced by Doug Henderson (musician)
Jetset Records albums